Miscou Island Lighthouse is an -tall landfall lighthouse located on the North-Eastern tip of Miscou Island, at the entrance of the Chaleur Bay. It was built in 1856 and currently in use by the Canadian Coast Guard who owns the lighthouse, the land it is on, and also maintains it.  It was built due to the shipwrecks that happened each year that could be prevented by a lighthouse.  James Murray from Newcastle won the bid to construct the lighthouse.  It is a federal Heritage Building that is open to the public to explore.  In 2009 a parking area, washrooms, picnic area and a deck around the lighthouse was added.

It has a third-order Fresnel lens. The original lens was shipped from England and arrived on October 10, 1856, and the person in charge of the only other lighthouse on the northern coast of New Brunswick, William Hay, was sent to oversee the installation.

Smoke conductors were installed in 1860 due to the fact that the calm weather could not sufficiently clear the smoke from the lantern room.  In 1874 a building was built which contained a steam fog whistle that had blasts of 5 seconds that were separated by 25 seconds of silence.

In 1946 the lighthouse was moved 200 feet inland.

Light Keepers

See also
 List of lighthouses in New Brunswick
 List of lighthouses in Canada

References

External links

 Aids to Navigation Canadian Coast Guard

Lighthouses completed in 1856
Lighthouses in New Brunswick
Buildings and structures in Gloucester County, New Brunswick
Lighthouses on the National Historic Sites of Canada register